The Garena Premier League (GPL) was a professional League of Legends esports league with teams in Southeast Asia (included teams from Taiwan, Hong Kong, Macau before 2015 and Vietnam before 2018). It was founded in 2012. The opening event took place on May 5 with Riot's CEO Brandon Beck, VP of Gaming Dustin Beck, Taiwanese game designer Jeff Lin, and Nikasaur attending personally. It is the first regional professional esports competition of League of Legends in the world. In last season - 2018 Spring - the league consists of 5 teams who are the champions of 5 national leagues in Southeast Asia. The top four teams of group stage are advanced to the playoff, which are held in a best-of-5 single elimination system.

In late 2014, Riot and Garena split teams from Taiwan, Macau, and Hong Kong into their own league, the LMS, which began play in Spring 2015. Following the changes, the GPL no longer sent teams directly to the League of Legends World Championship group stage.

In 2018, the Vietnam Championship Series (VCS) separated from the GPL. The winner of VCS will qualify for Mid-Season Invitational and World Championship without taking part in the GPL.

The 2018 GPL Spring Split was the last GPL tournament. Afterwards, the GPL was replaced by the League of Legends SEA Tour (LST) with a new format. The winner of the LST will represent Southeast Asia to qualify for Play-in Stage of Mid-Season Invitational and World Championship, begin from World Championship 2018.

Participants of GPL

Last season (2018 Spring split)

In mid-2018, the GPL was replaced with the LST, and the leagues of each country were replaced by "LST Qualifiers"

Former

Results

Record

Top-performing

References

External links
 Official website

2012 establishments in Singapore
Sports leagues in Asia
League of Legends competitions